Pink Lemonade may refer to:

Pink lemonade, a drink
Pink Lemonade, a group dance in Season 3 of Dance Moms
Pink Lemonade (album), 2014 album by Closure in Moscow
"Pink Lemonade" (song), 2018 single by James Bay
Pink Lemonade, a song by The Wombats 
Pink Lemonade, the opening theme for As Miss Beelzebub Likes, by Sangatsu no Phantasia